Henry Walton (1804–1865) was an American painter and lithographer active chiefly in Ithaca, New York and California.

Biography 
Walton was born in Saratoga Springs, New York in 1804, the son. of Judge Henry Walton and Mathilda (Cruger) Yates.

He moved to Ithaca before 1836, where he is believed to have been working for a company republishing David Burr's 1829 Atlas of New York State.  He produced both portraits and landscapes including View of Geneva (1837), Henry Clay (1844), Lithographic View of Jefferson (1847) (Jefferson is now Watkins Glen), and oil paintings of Addison (1850) and Painted Post (1851).

In 1840, during his stay in Ithaca, he was involved in a dispute over a portrait of William Henry Harrison, which political opponents claimed was actually a portrait of Andrew Jackson over which Walton had written the name Harrison.

In 1851 he joined the California Gold Rush, arriving in San Francisco on the steamer Oregon.  In California he continued producing artistic works such as the watercolor View of Grass Valley (1857), and presumably other works which have been lost.

In 1857 he moved to Michigan, where he died in Cassopolis 1865.  His wife Jane Orr died there in 1890.  There is no record of children.

Art Work and Career
His early works include lithographs of scenes from Saratoga Springs, Flat Rock Spring and the Pavilion Hotel.  His First works were thought to be in 1820. Henry Walton did portraits also. He worked in the finger lakes area for a time where he engraved for the Stone and Clark firm. 
Walton's work can be seen in New York, Virginia, and Vermont.

References

External links

''Lucifer's Falls, Henry Walton, 1820
View of Ithaca, Tompkins County, NY, taken from the South Hill, November 1838 
A Miner in his Cabin, 1853 watercolor by Walton at Oakland Museum of California website

1804 births
1865 deaths
19th-century American painters
19th-century American male artists
American male painters
American lithographers
Artists from the San Francisco Bay Area
People of the California Gold Rush
People from Saratoga Springs, New York
Artists from Ithaca, New York
People from Cassopolis, Michigan